Celeribacter ethanolicus is a bacterium from the genus of Celeribacter which has been isolated from seawater from the South China Sea.

References

Rhodobacteraceae
Bacteria described in 2016